This is a list of districts in the London Borough of Southwark:

 Bankside
 Bermondsey
 Borough/Southwark (historic Southwark)
 Camberwell
 Crystal Palace (east of Gipsy Hill railway station west of Crystal Palace Parade & Sydenham Hill)
 Denmark Hill
 Deptford (eastern corner of Surrey Quays)
 Dulwich
 Dulwich Village
 East Dulwich
 Elephant and Castle
 Herne Hill (east of Herne Hill railway station)
 Honor Oak (also partly in the Lewisham)
 Kennington
 Newington
 Nunhead
 Peckham
 Peckham Rye  
 Rotherhithe
 Surrey Quays
 Walworth
 West Dulwich (east of South Croxted Road)

The borough is located entirely within the SE postcode area.

Lists of places in London